Paramesvaravarman II was a Pallava king who ruled till 730/731 CE. He was killed by Gangas.

Reign 

Paramesvaravarman succeeded his father Narasimhavarman II in 725 and ruled till 731. During his reign, Kanchi was invaded by the Chalukyas with their Ganga allies and Paramesvaravarman had to surrender and accept humiliating conditions. To avenge this humiliation, Paramesvaravarman subsequently attacked the Gangas but was defeated and killed. Ugrodhaya (A neck ornament) was taken from him and the Ganga king assumed the title Permanadi. Following Paramesvaravarman's death in 731, the Simhavishnu line of Pallavas became extinct.

A hero-stone inscription attributed to his reign indicates that he ruled at least for 6 years.

References

Pallava kings